Ratchadaphisek Road is a major road in Bangkok, Thailand. Conceived in 1971 and opened in 1976, it connects earlier portions including Asok Montri, Wong Sawang and Charan Sanitwong Roads to form the city's inner ring road system. The road's name comes from the celebration 25th year of a monarch's reign of King Bhumibol Adulyadej.

Ratchadaphisek Road crosses major traffic arteries such as Sukhumvit Road and Sirat Expressway.

Ratchadaphisek entertainment district 
The Ratchadaphisek district stretches from the junction with Rama IX Road to the one with Sutthisan Winitchai Road. It is a well-known entertainment area, including shopping complexes such as The Esplanade, cinema complexes such as Major Cineplex, a night bazaar, and night markets as well as love hotels.

Along with Royal City Avenue (RCA) and Patpong, portions of the district are designated as "entertainment zones" and thus allowed to remain open until 02:00.

Ratchadaphisek MRT Station 
The Ratchadaphisek MRT Station is in a northern section of Ratchadaphisek Road, in the Din Daeng District.

References

See also 
 Ratchadaphisek MRT Station
 Suan Lum Night Bazaar Ratchadaphisek
 The Esplanade (Bangkok)
 

Streets in Bangkok